The Aristeion Prize was a European literary annual prize. It was given to authors for significant contributions to contemporary European literature, and to translators for exceptional translations of contemporary European literary works. 

The prize was established by the European Council in May 1989 as a way to promote of books and reading. Each year a jury composed of members selected by European Union countries decided on the winners. Works eligible for prizes had to be published in the three years preceding the date for the submission of entries.

It was awarded in a different Capital of Culture each year. It was first awarded in Glasgow in 1990 and was awarded every year until 1999 in Weimar. It was then discontinued and replaced by the EU's Culture 2000 programme, itself succeeded by the European Union Prize for Literature.

Winners

European Literary Prize

European Translation Prize

* Oeser was a German translator nominated by Ireland.

External links
 Aristeion Prize at Booktrust

Awards established in 1990
Awards disestablished in 1999
Belgian literary awards

European literary awards
Fiction awards